So Not Worth It is a South Korean streaming television series starring Park Se-wan, Shin Hyeon-seung, Choi Young-jae, Minnie and Han Hyun-min. It is Netflix's first Korean sitcom, which premiered on June 18, 2021.

Synopsis
The series revolves around a group of students with different multicultural backgrounds residing at a college dormitory in Seoul.

Cast

Main
 Park Se-wan as Se-wan, Korean advisor in charge of the dormitory management.
 Shin Hyeon-seung as Jamie, a newcomer from the US.
 Choi Young-jae as Sam, the son of the president of an Australian tteokbokki global food chain.
 Minnie as Minnie, a Thai student who loves Korean dramas and good-looking guys.
 Han Hyun-min as Hyun-min, a Korean student who couldn't enter the dormitory and has to travel five hours to go to university.
 Carson Allen as Carson, an American student who loves Korean food and is Se-wan's roommate.
 Joakim Sorensen as Hans, a Swedish graduate student that always sticks with his principles no matter what.
 Terris Brown as Terris, a Trinbagonian graduate student, tagged as a casanova.

Recurring
 Jung Yi-rang as dorm cleaning lady / North Korean announcer / Icheon grandma.
 Kim Ji-in as Joo-ri, Terris's girlfriend and housemate.
 Kim Kang-min as Kang Joon-young, a high school student.
 Lee Jae-joon as Il-seop, Carson's blind date and Terris's friend.
 Kim Jae-hwa as Aunt Mae, Se-wan's mother's debtor.
 Prae as Prae, a Thai student who was Minnie's classmate in high school.
 Miki as Miki, a student from Spain.

Guest
 Ha Dong-hoon as a restaurant customer where Jamie works (Ep. 1)
 Lee Ji-hoon as doctor (Ep. 1), a taxi driver (Ep. 11), a barber (Ep. 12)
 Kim Jung-min as a drug squad detective (Ep. 2)
 Hwang Woo-seul-hye as Do You Know the Way lead actress (Ep. 3)
 Yoon Seo-hyun as Do You Know the Way lead actor (Ep. 3)
 Julien Kang as Frenchman (Ep. 4)
 Im Won-hee as Hyun-min's mother's ex-boyfriend (Ep. 4)
 Han Soo-ah as Mi Suk (Eps. 5, 6)
 Jeong Jin-woon as Carson's boyfriend (Eps. 6, 7)
 Kang Ho-dong as speed quiz host (Ep. 6)
 Hwang Kwang-hee as online buyer (Ep. 6)
 Maeng Sueng-ji (Ep. 6)
 Yang Byung-yeol as Yoo Shi-jin (Ep. 6)
 Choi Yu-jin as Han Hyun-ah (Eps. 9, 11)
 Lee Soo-geun as fortuneteller (Ep. 9)
 Kim Hee-jung as Se-wan's mother (Ep. 10)
 Baek Joo-hee as Hyun-min's mother (Ep. 10)
 Yoon Jong-shin as karaoke employee (Ep. 11)
 Hwang Bo-reum-byeol as Ji Eun (Ep. 11)
 Lee Ji-won as Jun-yeong's tutor (Ep. 12)
  as Jun-yeong's tutor's younger brother (Ep. 12)
 Joo Yeon-woo as senior

Production
The series is directed by Kim Jung-sik, who previously worked on several hit Korean sitcoms like High Kick! (2006–07), High Kick: Revenge of the Short Legged (2011-12) and Potato Star 2013QR3 (2013), and Kwon Ik-joon of Three Men, Three Girls and Nonstop (2000–06), which teamed up for the birth of a global K-sitcom. Screenwriters Seo Eun-jung and Baek Ji-hyun previously worked on the first three seasons of hit sitcom Nonstop (2000–06).

An online live press conference for the series was held on June 16, 2021. Park Se-wan, Shin Hyun-seung, Choi Young-jae, Han Hyun-min, Joakim Sorensen, Carson Allen, Terris Brown, director Kwon Ik-joon, and director Kim Jung-sik attended the event. Minnie, who was unable to join the interview, talked about her character through a recorded video.

Original soundtrack

Reception

Audience viewership
So Not Worth It took second place in Thailand and top 10 in Saudi Arabia. The series lead the revival of the Korean sitcom that has almost disappeared from Korea after 10 years through OTT service.

Critical response
Decider's Joel Keller compared the series to the NBC sequel Saved by the Bell: The College Years, stating that "It reminds us of Saved By The Bell: The College Years, except with everyone speaking Korean." Keller described the series "that could fit among Netflix's American multi-cams" as not suitable as a "family sitcom, due to language and themes," but "it's brightly-lit, the jokes go at a sitcom's pace, and there's even a laugh-track." After watching the series, and praising the Korean skills of all the non-Korean actors, the crew at Decider recommended viewers to stream the show.

Bryan Tan writing for Yahoo! News praised the chemistry between the actors, and the performance of all of the foreign cast members "speaking native and seamlessly fluent Korean." He wrote, "It's definitely unique in the sense that it features such a diverse cast from all over the world". Tan concluded the review, "while the plot seemed to meander off here and there, the sitcom gives off a vibrant and comfortable feel akin to the American sitcom Friends" and recommended, if viewers are "looking for good fun and easy laughs, So Not Worth It is very much worth a watch".

In his review for ReadySteadyCut, Daniel Hart found the laugh track unnecessary — "So Not Worth It is not a laugh-out-loud experience, but it does tickle the soul. There's so much chaos and ridiculousness between these young characters that the only option is to enjoy the ride." Hart called the series, "incredibly engaging and flavorsome", labelled the cast as "brilliant; you can tell they had a wonderful time presenting a vibrant yet sometimes dysfunctional community," and applaud the writers who "completely nailed the importance of a vibrant community". He pointed that the series "signifies the growing wealth of K-drama and its impact on the original slate for streaming services. There's such a loyal community, and with these one-day hitters on Netflix, I hope that it brings in more audiences. Nostalgically, older audiences will feel armored by a series like this, while the young will find it oddly relatable."

Greg Wheeler of The Review Geek, rating the series 5.5 out of 10, opined that So Not Worth It is a "real mixed bag of quality" throughout 12 episodes and called it "Disney Channel silliness with a couple of well-timed comedic quips". Wheeler wrote, "With heavy exposition, an episodic format and one annoying laugh track throughout, So Not Worth It is going to be divisive." He concluded by saying that "So Not Worth It doesn't quite ring true to its name but perhaps should have been called "it's not quite worth it"."

Accolades

Future
In an interview, director Kwon Ik-joon mentioned that the production of a second season was dependent on the first season's popularity. He commented, "While chatting with Minnie in Thailand, I thought, 'I think it would be fun to go to a foreigner's house'. It would be fun to draw a story about going on a vacation to a country where a foreign friend lives."

References

External links
 
 
 

Korean-language Netflix original programming
2021 South Korean television series debuts
2020s college television series
South Korean pre-produced television series
South Korean college television series